Homoeosoma ardaloniphas is a species of snout moth in the genus Homoeosoma. It was described by R. L. Goodson and Herbert H. Neunzig in 1993. It is found in North America, including North Dakota.

The wingspan is about 25 mm.

References

Moths described in 1993
Phycitini